Pogorelovka is a rural locality (a selo) and the administrative center of Pogorelovskoye Rural Settlement, Korochansky District, Belgorod Oblast, Russia. The population was 2,218 as of 2010. There are 26 streets.

Geography 
Pogorelovka is located 4 km southwest of Korocha (the district's administrative centre) by road. Pogorely is the nearest rural locality.

References 

Rural localities in Korochansky District
Korochansky Uyezd